Hallingbury may refer to:

Great Hallingbury, a village in Essex, England 
Little Hallingbury a village in Essex, England